Time Scanners is a program that aired on PBS with hosts Dallas Campbell and Steve Burrows. Time Scanners laser scans historical buildings with the hope of investigating various features about them. Time Scanners debuted on July 1, 2014, on PBS as a three-part series. It currently airs in reruns on the National Geographic Channel with 10 minutes removed for commercials.

Series overview

Episodes

Season 1

Season 2

References

External links
 
 Official PBS Time Scanners website

2014 American television series debuts
American educational television series
PBS original programming
English-language television shows
2015 American television series endings
Lidar
2010s American documentary television series
Archaeology in popular culture